Hughson Mansion was a historic home located in the Hamlet of Loudonville, Town of Colonie, County of Albany, State of New York.  It was built between approximately 1866 and 1883 and was a large -story Second Empire style frame dwelling.  It featured a mansard roof with dormers, bracketed cornice, and window surrounds with Baroque details.

The mansion was listed on the National Register of Historic Places in 1979.

In the summer of 1953, the mansion was gifted by Mrs. Frank Hughson to Loudonville Community Church.  Loudonville Community Church used the mansion to conduct services and Sunday school until 1959, when a new sanctuary was built adjacent to the mansion.  From 1959 until the early 2000s, the mansion was used for Sunday school.  The mansion was demolished to make way for Loudonville Community Church's new sanctuary, which was completed in June 2002.

References

Houses on the National Register of Historic Places in New York (state)
Second Empire architecture in New York (state)
Houses in Albany County, New York
National Register of Historic Places in Albany County, New York